The Robert F. Kennedy Human Rights Award, was created by the Robert F. Kennedy Memorial in 1984, now known as the Robert F. Kennedy Human Rights to honour individuals around the world who have shown great courage and have made a significant contribution to human rights in their country.

In addition to receiving a financial award, laureates can partner with the RFK Center on projects to advance their human rights work, benefiting from the resources and technologies at the foundation's disposal. Some have achieved their goals, some are in exile from their home country. The majority continue to live in their home country and work with the support of the center to establish the human rights they are working for.

Since 1984, awards have been given to 37 individuals and organizations, from 24 countries.

The Robert F. Kennedy Human Rights foundation also presents Ripple of Hope Awards annually to business, entertainment, and activist leaders. The name of the award is inspired by Kennedy's Ripple of Hope speech in 1966. They first presented the award in 2007.

Laureates

Ripple of Hope Award 

†=Recipient returned their award.

See also 
List of human rights organisations
Day of Affirmation Address

References

External links
 Official Website
 RFK Human Rights Award Ceremony on PBS, 1989

Robert F. Kennedy
Human rights awards